The Guariviara River is a river of Panama. It drains into the southeast shore of Chiriquí Lagoon.

"The Guariviara is a river that suffers catastrophic flooding; in its mouth, the river has built a powerful delta cone"

See also
List of rivers of Panama

References

Rivers of Panama